Digitus minimus literally means smallest digit and can refer to:
 Little finger (fifth finger)
 little toe (fifth toe)